Theridion flavonotatum is a species of cobweb spider in the family Theridiidae. It is found in the United States and Cuba.

References

Theridiidae
Articles created by Qbugbot
Spiders described in 1879